Nick Hits may refer to:

Nick Hits (TV programming block), a previous television block of Nickelodeon in Latin America
NickMusic (Dutch TV channel), formerly known as Nick Hits, a Dutch pay-TV music video channel